Eyre Peninsula is a peninsula in the Australian state of South Australia

Eyre Peninsula may also refer to.

Eyre Peninsula Railway, a railway 
Eyre Peninsula Tribune, a newspaper
Eyre Peninsula blue gum, a species of tree
Eyre Peninsula bushfire, 2005, a bushfire

See also
District Council of Lower Eyre Peninsula
Railway stations on the Eyre Peninsula
Eyre (disambiguation)